The Weekend Has Landed is the second studio album by Ultrabeat.

Release

A limited number of copies of the album were released on December 1, 2008 under the title of Discolights: The Album however due to distribution problems and the album leaking on to file sharing websites the release date was eventually pushed back until October 26, 2009. The album was renamed The Weekend Has Landed and had a slightly altered track listing from the original Discolights album.

Track listing

Cut tracks
Four songs originally included on Discolights: The Album in 2008 that were removed from the final track list:
 "She's Like the Wind" (Patrick Swayze, Stacey Widelitz) – 2:41
 "Runaway" (Di Scala, Henry) – 2:51
 "What Will It Take?" (Di Scala, Henry, Wayne Donnelly) – 3:18
 "Right Here Waiting" (Richard Marx) – 2:37

Personnel
Ultrabeat
 Mike Di Scala – producer, vocals
 Chris Henry – producer

Production
 Darren Styles – producer (on tracks 2 & 9)

Additional musicians
 Rebecca Rudd – vocals (on tracks 6, 11, 16 & 17)
 MC Whizzkid – vocals (on tracks 1 & 10)
 MC Cyanide – vocals (on tracks 12 & 14)

Other personnel
 Ignition Creative Business Solutions – design
 Ian McManus – photography

Release history

Chart performance

References

External links
 Official artist profile (aatw.com)
 
 

2009 albums
All Around the World Productions albums
Ultrabeat albums
Universal Music TV albums